Ingersoll Airport  is a public use airport located two nautical miles (2.3 mi, 3.7 km) northwest of the central business district of Canton, a city in Fulton County, Illinois, United States. The airport is owned by the Canton Park District. It is included in the FAA's National Plan of Integrated Airport Systems for 2011–2015, which categorized it as a general aviation facility.

Although many U.S. airports use the same three-letter location identifier for the FAA and IATA, this facility is assigned CTK by the FAA but has no designation from the IATA.

The airport received $360,000 as part of the Rebuild Illinois program to help the airport repair and maintain facilities during the COVID-19 pandemic.

Facilities and aircraft 
It has two asphalt paved runways: 18/36 is 3,899 by 75 feet (1,188 x 23 m) and 9/27 is 3,295 by 60 feet (1,004 x 18 m).

For the 12-month period ending May 31, 2021, the airport has an average of 52 aircraft operations per day, or roughly 19,000 per year. All traffic consists of general aviation. For that same period, there are 18 aircraft based on the airport: 17 single-engine and 1 multiengine.

The airport has an FBO run by the Canton Park District. Fuel is available.

Accidents & Incidents
On October  12, 2017, a Eurocopter MBB-BK 117 C-2 crashed at Ingersoll during a training flight at night. The probable cause was found to be the flight instructor's cyclic control during a hover, resulting in a hard landing. The aircraft's main rotor was substantially damaged.

References

External links 
 Aerial photo as of 5 April 1998 from USGS The National Map
 

Airports in Illinois
Transportation buildings and structures in Fulton County, Illinois